György Bognár (born 5 November 1961) is a Hungarian football coach and a former player. He is the manager of Paks.

Club career
He had two successful periods. The first was with MTK Budapest FC and his second period was with Budapesti VSC.

International career
He made his debut for the Hungarian national team in 1985, and got 50 caps and 8 goals until 1994. He was a participant at the 1986 FIFA World Cup in Mexico, where Hungary failed to progress from the group stage.

Managerial career
In 2020 he was appointed as the manager of Paks. He was managing his son, István Bognár and his elder son works as the assistant coach.

On 14 February 2023, Bognár returned to Paks.

Personal life
He is the father of István Bognár.

References

1961 births
Living people
People from Baja, Hungary
Sportspeople from Bács-Kiskun County
Hungarian footballers
Association football midfielders
Hungary international footballers
1986 FIFA World Cup players
MTK Budapest FC players
Hungarian expatriate footballers
Expatriate footballers in France
SC Toulon players
Hungarian expatriate sportspeople in France
Expatriate footballers in Belgium
Standard Liège players
Hungarian expatriate sportspeople in Belgium
Budapesti VSC footballers
Belgian Pro League players
Ligue 1 players
Hungarian football managers
Budapesti VSC managers
MTK Budapest FC managers
FC Sopron managers
Felcsút SE managers
Paksi FC managers
Budaörsi SC managers
Nemzeti Bajnokság I managers